Haxhiu is an Albanian surname that may refer to
Ahmet Haxhiu (1932–1994), Kosovo Albanian political activist 
Albulena Haxhiu (born 1987), Kosovo Albanian politician 
Baton Haxhiu (born 1968), Albanian journalist from Kosovo 
Fatmir Haxhiu (1927–2001), Albanian painter
Gerd Haxhiu (born 1972), Albanian football coach 
Mexhit Haxhiu (born 1943), Albanian football player

See also
Abdurrahman Roza Haxhiu Stadium in Lushnjë, Albania 

Albanian-language surnames